Anatole Taubman (born 23 December 1970) is a Swiss actor. He is best known for his performance as Elvis in Quantum of Solace. He has appeared in more than ninety films since 1998 and has played major roles in several films including The Circle.

Selected filmography

References

External links 
 
 

1970 births
Living people
Swiss male film actors
Male actors from Zürich